Anna Sibinska (born 1963) is a Swedish politician. From September 2018 to September 2022, she served as Member of the Riksdag representing the constituency of Gothenburg Municipality.

References 

Living people
1963 births
Place of birth missing (living people)
Members of the Riksdag from the Green Party
Members of the Riksdag 2018–2022
21st-century Swedish politicians
21st-century Swedish women politicians
Women members of the Riksdag